The third USS Seneca (SP-427), later USS SP-427, was a United States Navy minesweeper and patrol vessel in commission from 1917 to 1919.

Seneca was built as a civilian steam yacht in 1888 at Boston, Massachusetts. On 7 May 1917, the U.S. Navy acquired her from her owner, the Johnson Lighterage Company, for use as a minesweeper and patrol vessel on the section patrol during World War I. She was commissioned as USS Seneca (SP-427) on 17 July 1917.

Based at Tompkinsville, Staten Island, New York, Seneca carried out minesweeping and patrol duties for the rest of World War I. In 1918, she was renamed USS SP-427.

SP-427 was decommissioned on 2 January 1919. She was stricken from the Navy List on 6 January 1919 and returned to Johnson Lighterage the same day.

Seneca (SP-427) should not be confused the barge , which was in commission at the same time.

References

Department of the Navy Naval History and Heritage Command Online Library of Selected Images: Civilian Ships: Seneca (Steam Yacht, 1888). Served as USS Seneca (SP-427) and USS SP-427 in 1917-1919
NavSource Online: Section Patrol Craft Photo Archive: SP-427 ex-Seneca (SP 427)

Minesweepers of the United States Navy
World War I minesweepers of the United States
Patrol vessels of the United States Navy
World War I patrol vessels of the United States
Ships built in Boston
1888 ships
Individual yachts
Steam yachts